Ardmore station is a train station in Ardmore, Pennsylvania, located on the Pennsylvania Main Line. The station serves several Amtrak Keystone Service trains daily, as well as all SEPTA Paoli/Thorndale Line local regional rail trains.

The station is situated in a large residential population and sees its fair share of reverse commuters.

In 2017, the average total weekday SEPTA boardings at this station was 821, and the average total weekday SEPTA alightings was 749.

History

Original station

The original station at Ardmore was designed by the firm of Wilson Brothers and Company of Philadelphia as a two-story stone structure with a slate roof.

The walls were built of gneiss stone laid irregularly with sandstone lintels. It had a daylight basement by virtue of the land sloping to the rear, which served as housing for the agent, containing a bedroom, dining room, kitchen, and living room. The ground floor waiting room measured 20x35 feet, a ladies' room measuring 14x18 feet, a gentleman's smoking room 11x12 feet, a baggage room 8x12 feet, a telegraph office and ticket office of 9x18 feet, and a bedroom. The second story had three bedrooms and the signal tower.

Pennsylvania Railroad
The Pennsylvania Railroad operated commuter rail services at Ardmore until merging with the New York Central in 1968 becoming the Penn Central which then filed for bankruptcy in 1970. Conrail was then responsible for operating all the former PRR commuter rail services including over the Main Line to Paoli/Thorndale Line until 1983 when SEPTA took over all regional rail operations in South Eastern Pennsylvania.

Transit-oriented development
Lower Merion Township has considered plans to replace the station as part of a larger economic revitalization "transit oriented development" (TOD) project for the neighborhood. Parts of the plan, however, relied on using eminent domain to force the purchase of private property, which would then be transferred to a private developer. For this reason, it met significant opposition among some members of community.

In 2008 the plan of developer Dranoff Properties for the TOD project was accepted and the Philadelphia-based company was named to develop a $180 million mixed use project for the station area with ground breaking anticipated in 2012. In August, 2010, the Redevelopment Assistance Capital Program of the State of Pennsylvania made a $9 million grant to the project following an earlier $6 million grant made in 2008.

Future

While Ardmore is the busiest station on the line, it is currently very underdeveloped, consisting of only low-level platforms and small canopies. However, the station is currently undergoing a major upgrade, that will bring high-level platforms, a full canopy, footbridge, and covered parking deck. The project started in January 2022  and is expected to take around 18 months to complete.

Station layout
An Amtrak QuikTrak machine is available in the station. SEPTA permit parking is available at the station, and the township provides additional metered parking in nearby lots. The station has two low-level side platforms with pathways connecting the platforms to the inner tracks.

References

External links 

 SEPTA – Ardmore Station
Ardmore Amtrak & SEPTA Station (USA RailGuide – TrainWeb)

SEPTA Regional Rail stations
Former Pennsylvania Railroad stations
Amtrak stations in Pennsylvania
Philadelphia to Harrisburg Main Line
Lower Merion Township, Pennsylvania
Railway stations in Montgomery County, Pennsylvania
Railway stations in the United States opened in 1870